The 1898 U.S. Open was the fourth U.S. Open, held June 17–18 at Myopia Hunt Club in South Hamilton, Massachusetts, northeast of Boston. Fred Herd captured his only major title, seven strokes ahead of runner-up Alex Smith.

For the first time, the U.S. Open was expanded to 72 holes, meaning the players had to complete eight loops around Myopia's 9-hole course. Herd trailed leader Willie Anderson by six shots after 36 holes on Friday, but his 75 in the third round on Saturday morning was the low round of the championship and gave him a six-shot advantage after 54 holes. Despite an 84 in the afternoon for 328, Herd prevailed over Alex Smith by seven, with Anderson finishing in third. Only Herd and Smith managed to break 80 in any round of the championship.

Herd's fondness for liquor was well-known; after his win, tournament officials required him to leave a deposit to prevent him from selling the trophy for drinking money. His brother Sandy won The Open Championship in 1902.

Past champions in the field 

Source:

Round summaries

First round
Friday, June 17, 1898 (morning)

Source:

Second round
Friday, June 17, 1898 (afternoon)

Source:

Third round
Saturday, June 18, 1898 (morning)

Source:

Final round
Saturday, June 18, 1898 (afternoon)

Source:

Amateurs: Leeds (347), Curtis (356), Tyng (361), Shaw (364), Sweny (384), Rutherford (388).

References

External links
1898 U.S. Open
USGA Championship Database

U.S. Open (golf)
U.S. Open (golf)
U.S. Open (golf)
Golf in Massachusetts
Hamilton, Massachusetts
Events in Essex County, Massachusetts
U.S. Open (golf)
Sports competitions in Massachusetts
Sports in Essex County, Massachusetts
Tourist attractions in Essex County, Massachusetts
U.S. Open (golf)